Caungula is a town and municipality in Lunda Norte Province in Angola. The municipality had a population of 28,164 in 2014.

References

Populated places in Lunda Norte Province
Municipalities of Angola